Zheng Pengfei (born 7 April 1993) is a Chinese sprint canoeist. He along with Canoe Sprint partner Liu Hao, competed in the men's C-2 1000 metres event at the Tokyo 2020 Summer Olympics and won Silver.

References

External links
 

1993 births
Living people
Chinese male canoeists
Olympic canoeists of China
Canoeists at the 2020 Summer Olympics
Medalists at the 2020 Summer Olympics
Olympic medalists in canoeing
Olympic silver medalists for China
Place of birth missing (living people)
Asian Games medalists in canoeing
Canoeists at the 2014 Asian Games
Canoeists at the 2018 Asian Games
Asian Games silver medalists for China
Medalists at the 2014 Asian Games